The Last of the Bergeracs (Italian: L'ultimo dei Bergerac) is a 1934 Italian comedy film directed by Gennaro Righelli and starring Ketty Maya, Arturo Falconi and Italia Almirante-Manzini.

Cast

References

Bibliography 
 Goble, Alan. The Complete Index to Literary Sources in Film. Walter de Gruyter, 1999.

External links 
 

1934 films
Italian comedy films
Italian black-and-white films
1934 comedy films
Films directed by Gennaro Righelli
Cines Studios films
1930s Italian films